The American Whig–Cliosophic Society (Whig-Clio) is a political, literary, and debating society at Princeton University and the oldest debate union in the United States. Its precursors, the American Whig Society and the Cliosophic Society, were founded at Princeton in 1769 and 1765 by James Madison, William Paterson, Oliver Ellsworth, and Aaron Burr.

Originally two separate organizations, the American Whig Society and the Cliosophic Society were the primary student organizations at Princeton until the end of the 19th century. They "functioned in many ways as separate colleges within the College of New Jersey," creating their own schedule of classes and offering diplomas to graduates." Clio's members were usually northerners, while Whig's typically came from the southern states.

In the decades before the Civil War, the societies frequently debated the subject of slavery. Despite their regional differences, both societies voted regularly in support of slavery's continuation and in opposition to emancipation. The subject united the two societies, which otherwise often disagreed.

Competition from eating clubs, sports teams, and other student activities eventually drew members away from the societies. Prompted by declining memberships, the societies were merged to form the American Whig–Cliosophic Society in 1928. The organization's modern role is to serve as an umbrella organization for political and debating activity at Princeton. The Society frequently hosts events open to all Princeton students, as well as to faculty and community members. These include the Society's monthly Senate Debates on topics related to national or campus policy, lectures and discussion dinners with guest speakers, and social events. The Society also oversees four subsidiary groups: the International Relations Council (IRC), Princeton's Model Congress (PMC), Princeton Debate Panel (PDP), and Princeton Mock Trial (PMT).

The two original societies continue as "houses" within the larger American Whig–Cliosophic Society, with Whig considered the more liberal house and Clio the more conservative.

Subsidiaries

Princeton Debate Panel (PDP) 

The Princeton Debate Panel competes regularly against teams such as the Oxford Union, the Cambridge Union Society, and the Hart House Debating Club. It competes most frequently in the American Parliamentary Debate Association league, of which it is a founding member, and where it currently holds the record for most Team of the Year (TOTY), Speaker of the Year (SOTY), and Novice of the Year (NOTY) awards. It also won (as of 2018) five National Championships and a record eight National Championship top speaker awards. It also hosted the World Universities Debating Championships three times. Its alumni include Supreme Court Justice Samuel Alito, international relations scholar Joseph Nye, and diplomat John Foster Dulles.

Princeton Mock Trial (PMT) 

Princeton Mock Trial is a top-15 nationally-ranked mock trial program. It ranked 2nd in the American Mock Trial Association National Championship in 2013 and won the AMTA Regional Tournament held at Princeton in 2008. It annually hosts a Moot Court tournament for high school students from throughout the Mid-Atlantic region.

International Relations Council (IRC) 

The International Relations Council is the biggest subsidiary of Whig-Clio in terms of membership. It hosts Sunday weekly meetings for students to discuss international events and developments.  It also sponsors two annual international affairs conferences: one for the high school level Princeton Model United Nations Conference (PMUNC) and one for the collegiate Princeton Interactive Crisis Simulation (PICSIM). PMUNC, the high school Model UN conference hosted by the IRC, attracts some 1000 high school students from around the world.

Model Congress (PMC) 

Currently, Princeton Model Congress offers high school students the opportunity to simulate the experience of serving in Congress, sitting on the bench as a Supreme Court Justice, counseling the Commander in Chief as a member of the Presidential Cabinet or covering the Federal Government in print as a part of the Press Corps. The conference draws approximately 1,200 participants.

General

Whig-Cliosophic Honorary Debate Panel 

The Whig-Cliosophic Honorary Debate Panel (WCHDP) sponsors and promotes prize debates at Princeton University. Incumbent to this purpose is the goal of not only rewarding but fostering top-caliber debate at Princeton. Annually-held debates and oratory contests include the Lynde Prize Debate, the Class of 1876 Memorial Prize for Debate in Politics, the Maclean Prize and Junior Orator Awards, the Walter E. Hope Prizes in Speaking and Debating, the Spencer Trask Medals for Debating, and the William Rusher ’44 Prize in Debating.

James Madison Award for Distinguished Public Service 

The James Madison Award for Distinguished Public Service is a longstanding tradition and the highest distinction bestowed by the Whig-Cliosophic Society. Past recipients include:

 1960 Dean Acheson 
 1961 Robert Meyner 
 1962 Stuart Symington 
 1963 Maxwell Taylor 
 1964 Adlai Stevenson 
 1965 Harlan Cleveland 
 1966 Claiborne Pell,
Allen W. Dulles
 1967 John Harlan 
 1968 Roy Wilkins 
 1969 Earl Warren 
 1970 Averell Harriman
 1971 Robert F. Goheen
 1972 Walter Cronkite
 1973 J. W. Fulbright 
 1974 Golda Meir
 1975 William O. Douglas
 1976 Mike Mansfield 
 1978 Leon Jaworski
 1979 Roger Baldwin
 1980 Millard C. Farmer 
 1981 Potter Stewart 
 1982 Jacob K. Javits 
 1984 Bob Hope 
 1985 George Kennan 
 1986 Paul Volcker 
 1987 Warren Burger 
 1988 Barry Goldwater 
 1989 C. Leslie Rice Jr.
 1990 Ralph Nader   
 1991 Jesse Jackson
 1994 Sarah Brady 
 1995 Robert MacNeil
 1997 Patricia Schroeder 
 2000 Bill Clinton 
 2002 Kofi Annan 
 2003 William Frist
 2003 Sandra Day O’Connor
 2004 George Shultz
 2006 Stephen Breyer
 2008 Antonin Scalia  
 2009 Jeffrey Sachs  
 2010 Prince Hans-Adam II 
 2013 Chen Guangcheng
 2014 Ben Bernanke
 2015 Jimmy Carter
 2016 Ted Cruz
 2020 Terri Sewell

Governing Council 

The Governing Council of the Whig-Clio Society is in charge of managing the affairs of the Society. The positions of President, Vice President, Director of Program, President of the Senate, Secretary, and Whig and Clio Party Chairs are elected by all members of the Society to serve 1-year terms. The elected officers also select a corp of appointed officers.

Notably, Tina Ravitz, Class of 1976, was the Society's first female President.

Stances on right-wing figures 

The Society has taken a number of stances against controversial conservative political figures. In 2018, Whig-Clio co-presidents disinvited conservative University of Pennsylvania Law Professor Amy Wax after she had made negative remarks about the quality of her Black students. In 2020, a conservative member of the society complained that he had proposed inviting Washington Post columnist George Will and Federal Judge Neomi Rao to speak at the society, but its governing council had voted not to. In March 2021, the Society voted to revoke Senator Ted Cruz's James Madison Award for Distinguished Public Service after his attempt to overturn the results of the 2020 U.S. presidential election based on false claims of voter fraud. The Society reversed course a month later and decided not to revoke the award.

Notable alumni 

The Society was founded in 1765 by prominent Princetonians including President James Madison and Vice-President Aaron Burr. Alumni in modern times include Supreme Court Justice Samuel Alito, Secretaries of State James Baker and George Shultz, and Senators Adlai Stevenson and Ted Cruz. A full list of notable Whig-Clio alumni is linked below.

Other historic societies

 The Philomathean Society of the University of Pennsylvania
 The Philolexian Society of Columbia University
 The Philodemic Society of Georgetown University
 The Washington Literary Society and Debating Union and Jefferson Literary and Debating Society of the University of Virginia
 The Union-Philanthropic (Literary) Society of Hampden–Sydney College
 The Dialectic and Philanthropic Societies of the University of North Carolina at Chapel Hill
 The Phi Kappa Literary Society of University of Georgia in Athens
 The Demosthenian Literary Society of The University of Georgia in Athens

See also
 Father Bombo's Pilgrimage to Mecca

Related
 : Cambridge Union Society
 : Oxford Union Society
 : University of St Andrews Union Debating Society
 : The Durham Union Society
 : London School of Economics, Grimshaw International Relations Club
 :Yale Debate Association
 :Berkeley Forum
 :Jefferson Literary and Debating Society at the University of Virginia
 :Dialectic and Philanthropic Societies at the University of North Carolina at Chapel Hill
 :Olivaint Conférence
 :Olivaint Conference of Belgium

References

External links
 Official Web Site: American Whig-Cliosophic Society

Student debating societies
Princeton University
College literary societies in the United States
Youth organizations based in New Jersey